Kaikaew is a Thai surname. Notable people with the surname include:

Noraphat Kaikaew (born 1990), Thai football player
Pakin Kaikaew (born 1986), Thai football player

Thai-language surnames